Baron Darling, of Langham in the County of Essex, is a title in the Peerage of the United Kingdom. It was created on 12 January 1924 for Sir Charles Darling, a former Conservative Member of Parliament for Deptford and Judge of the High Court of Justice.  the title is held by his great-grandson, the third Baron, who succeeded his father in 2003.

The family seat is Intwood Hall, near Intwood, Norfolk.

Barons Darling (1924—)

  Charles John Darling, 1st Baron Darling (1849–1936)
 Hon. John Clive Darling (1887—1933)
  Robert Charles Henry Darling, 2nd Baron Darling (1919–2003)
  Robert Julian Henry Darling, 3rd Baron Darling (1944—)
 (1) Hon. Robert James Cyprian Darling (1972—)
 (2) Robert Jack Lewis Darling (2008—)
 (3) Hon. Henry Thomas Unthank Darling (1978—)
 James Weyland Darling (1922—1941)

The heir apparent is the present holder's son, the Hon. Robert James Cyprian Darling (born 1972).

The heir apparent's heir apparent is the present holder's grandson, Robert Jack Lewis Darling (born 2008).

Arms

Notes

References
Kidd, Charles, Williamson, David (editors). Debrett's Peerage and Baronetage (1990 edition). New York: St Martin's Press, 1990, 

Baronies in the Peerage of the United Kingdom
Noble titles created in 1924
Noble titles created for UK MPs